China Spring High School is a public high school located in the unincorporated community of China Spring, Texas (USA). It is part of the China Spring Independent School District located in the China Spring area of McLennan County, northwest of Waco and classified as a 4A school by the UIL.  In 2015, the school was rated "Met Standard" by the Texas Education Agency. It is rated a 7/10 on the Great Schools website.

Athletics
The China Spring Cougars compete in the following sports:

Cross Country, Volleyball, Football, Basketball, Powerlifting, Soccer, Golf, Tennis, Track, Softball & Baseball

State Titles
Baseball - 
1987(2A), 1989(2A), 1993(2A), 2000(3A)
Girls Basketball - 
2006(3A)
Football - 
1978(1A), 2021(4A/D2), 2022(4A/D1)
Boys Golf - 
1984(3A), 1985(3A), 1987(2A), 1988(2A), 1989(2A)
Girls Golf - 
1993(2A), 1994(3A), 1997(3A), 1998(3A)
Powerlifting - 
2002(3A/D2)

State Finalists  
Football - 
1979(1A), 2007(3A/D2), 
Softball - 
1998(3A), 2010(3A)
Marching Band - 
1991(2A), 1993(2A), 2012(3A), 2016(4A), 2020(4A), 2021(4A), 2022(4A)

Alumni
Shawn Bell Baylor Quarterback and college football coach
Kyle Nelson NFL longsnapper
Nate Self US Army Officer, Silver Star, Bronze Star, and Purple Heart recipient, and author

References

External links
China Spring ISD

Schools in McLennan County, Texas
Public high schools in Texas